Kedrovaya is a rural locality (a settlement) in Kabansky District, Republic of Buryatia, Russia. The population was 89 as of 2010. There are 6 streets.

References 

Rural localities in Kabansky District
Populated places on Lake Baikal